Baruch Werber (1810, Brody – 31 July 1876, Brody) was a Galician Jewish Hebraist, author, publisher, and editor.

Werber, who was a follower of Isaac Erter and Nachman Krochmal, began his literary career writing for the Hebrew weekly Ha-Mevasser. In addition to numerous articles which appeared in this magazine, Werber wrote Megillat Kohelet (Lemberg, 1862; 2d ed., Warsaw, 1876), an introduction and commentary to Ecclesiastes, and Toledot Adam (Brody, 1870), a biography of Albert Cohn.

Bibliography

References
 

1810 births
1876 deaths
Hebraists
19th-century publishers (people)
Austrian newspaper editors
Austrian Empire Jews
Jews from Galicia (Eastern Europe)
Hebrew-language writers
19th-century Jews
People from Brody
People of the Haskalah